Ruthelma Stevens (1903–1984) was an American film actress.

Filmography

References

Bibliography
 Solomon, Aubrey. The Fox Film Corporation, 1915-1935: A History and Filmography. McFarland, 2011.

External links
 

1903 births
1984 deaths
American film actresses
People from Wichita, Kansas
20th-century American actresses